Undercovers may refer to:

 Being undercover, disguising one's own identity
 Undercovers (Trixter album), 1994
 Undercovers (Night Shift album), 2002
 Undercovers (TV series), an American action spy television series created by J. J. Abrams